The Thinite Confederacy is an Egyptological term for a hypothesized tribal confederation in ancient Egypt. It is thought to have preceded the full unification of Upper Egypt . The leaders of the Thinite Confederacy were most likely tribal nobles. Based at the city of Thinis, the Thinite Confederacy would later be incorporated into the combined state known as "Upper and Lower Egypt".

The evidence of the "Thinite Confederacy" is mostly speculative and in part relies on Manetho. Modern Egyptologists have a number of competing hypotheses to explain conjectured "proto-dynastic" events that presumably led to the unification under the First Dynasty. Many scholars today mention evidence for a "Dynasty 0" that preceded the First Dynasty I. The term "Dynasty 00" is also used for the period preceding Dynasty 0 in connection with the Abydos-Thinis area and may correspond to a theoretical "Thinite Confederacy". The terms "Dynasty 0" and especially "Dynasty 00" are widely seen as playful, but are frequently used nonetheless in absence of a more agreed-upon term.

In archaeological terms, this is referred to as "Naqada III".

It makes an appearance in the PC game Pharaoh.

References

Bibliography

External links
 "Dynasty 00", by Francesco Rafaele


Naqada III
Former confederations